Sungai Ara Football Club is a team playing in Malaysia FAM League. The team is based in Sungai Ara, Penang, Malaysia. In 2014 the team was promoted to play in Malaysia FAM League.

History

Stadium

Players

Current squad

Transfers

For recent transfers, see List of Malaysian football transfers 2017 and List of Malaysian football transfers summer 2016

Officials

Coaching staff

Sponsorship

References

External links
 Official Facebook

Malaysia FAM League clubs
Football clubs in Malaysia